The Murum Dam is a gravity dam on the Murum River in Sarawak, Malaysia. Construction began in 2008. The dam's reservoir began to fill in July 2013 and the first generator was commissioned in December 2014. The fourth and final turbine began operations on 8 June 2015. Concerns have been raised about the displacement of the Dayak people and the removal of rainforest due to the construction of the dam.

The dam site is located on the Murum River, which is in the uppermost part of the Rajang River basin,  from Bintulu. The upstream of Rajang river includes four steps, which are Pelagus, Bakun, Murum, and Belaga.

See also

Sarawak Corridor of Renewable Energy
Environmental concerns with electricity generation

References

2015 establishments in Malaysia
Hydroelectric power stations in Malaysia
Dams completed in 2014
Dams in Sarawak
Roller-compacted concrete dams
Gravity dams
Energy infrastructure completed in 2015